Shimon Cohen is an Israeli former professional association footballer who played for the Israeli national team and the Baltimore Bays of the National Professional Soccer League.

Cohen played nine games, scoring one goal, with the Israeli national team between 1962 and 1966.  In 1967, he spent a single season on loan with the Baltimore Bays in the NPSL.

References

External links
 NASL Profile
 

1942 births
Jewish Israeli sportspeople
Living people
Israeli footballers
Baltimore Bays players
Beitar Tel Aviv F.C. players
Hapoel Petah Tikva F.C. players
Hapoel Tel Aviv F.C. players
Shimshon Tel Aviv F.C. players
Israeli expatriate footballers
Expatriate soccer players in the United States
Israeli expatriate sportspeople  in the United States
National Professional Soccer League (1967) players
Association football forwards
Israel international footballers
20th-century Israeli Jews
21st-century Israeli Jews